Mahua is a genus of moss belonging to the family Sematophyllaceae.

The species of this genus are found in South America.

Species:
 Mahua enervis W.R.Buck, 1983

References

Hypnaceae
Moss genera